Sapna Pabbi is a British actress and model known for her work as Kiran Rathod in the Indian television series 24 and the Hindi films, Khamoshiyan and Drive.

Career
At the age of 22, whilst studying at Aston University in Birmingham, Pabbi was chosen as the face of Trinny and Susannah.

Pabbi has appeared in Ghar Aaja Pardesi as Rudrani, and as Kiran Rathod in 24. Pabbi has also appeared in commercials, such as the Galaxy Chocolate ad alongside Arjun Rampal, the Pepsi ad with Virat Kohli and the Fair and Lovely ad alongside Yami Gautam. Pabbi is currently shooting for her second film, Shoojit Sircar's Satra Ko Shaadi Hai opposite television actor Barun Sobti. Pabbi has also acted in a co-production between Vishesh Films and Fox Star Studios, Khamoshiyan, directed by debutant Karan Darra opposite Ali Fazal and Gurmeet Chaudhary.

Filmography

Films

Television

Web series

References

External links

 
 

Living people
1980s births
Actresses from London
English film actresses
English female models
British film actresses
British television actresses
British people of Punjabi descent
British actresses of Indian descent
English expatriates in India
Actresses in Hindi cinema
Actresses in Punjabi cinema
British expatriate actresses in India
European actresses in India
Alumni of Aston University
21st-century English actresses
Year of birth uncertain